Hugh 'Hughie' O'Reilly was a Gaelic footballer and manager of Cootehill Celtic GAA Club and the Cavan county team.

Playing career
The Cootehill clubman is the only man to be involved in all of Cavan's Senior All-Ireland Championship victories. He played and won 2 All-Ireland Senior Football Championship medal in 1933 and captained Cavan to victory in the 1935 final. Hughie also featured on the 1927 All-Ireland-winning junior team.

Management career
He completed a record of three All-Ireland senior titles in 1947, '48 and '52 in the space of five years and National Football League titles in 1948 and '50 as manager for Cavan. Cootehill Celtic GAA's pitch in the town is named after him.
 
He was a great disciplinarian and laid most emphasis in training on the basic skills, of catching, kicking and passing the ball. He had the great attribute of being able to instil a sense of total confidence in the players, - a vital prerequisite for winning.  
 
Hughie had 28 famous tips, many of which are still valid today. 
 
1. Play your own area 
2. Goalie, keep backs in position 
3. Full backs, clear ball to wings 
4. Backs mark closely, but at the same time dominate play 
5. Backs keep between opponent and goal 
6. Half backs place forward with clearance 
7. Backs meet in coming forwards 
8. Always mark free kicks 
9. Never let the ball hop 
10. Never turn your back on the ball 
11. Two kicks are greater than one 
12. Get in front of your opponent 
13. When not in possession, get into position 
14. Keep up pressure 
15. Don't hesitate to shoot inside 30 yards 
16. Shoot for points, goals will follow 
17. Move into position for pass 
18. Full forwards remember half forwards 
19. Play ball on the ground 
20. Go forward to meet the ball 
21. Kick ball before being tackled 
22. Always play the ball 
23. Avoid clashing 
24. Keep trying 
25. Remember your opponent is getting it as hard as yourself 
26. Keep moving all during game and take deep breaths 
27. Get off the ground when about to receive a knock 
28. Go out and win but for God's sake, play the game

References

Year of birth missing
Year of death missing
Cavan inter-county Gaelic footballers
Gaelic football managers